A Couple of Days in Larsville is a country album from Norwegian singer Elisabeth Andreassen. The album was released in Australia, Denmark, Iceland and Sweden around New Year's Day 2005.

Track listing

Charts

References

External links 
 

2004 albums
Elisabeth Andreassen albums